Camp Sam Hatcher is located in Newport, North Carolina. It is owned and operated by East Carolina Council, Boy Scouts of America.

Boy Scouts of America
Summer camps in North Carolina